"Cry" is a song by American DJ and producer Gryffin and Swedish singer and songwriter John Martin. It was released on July 30, 2020. It was written by Gary Go, Gryffin, John Martin and Michel Zitron and produced by Gryffin and Jason Ross.

Background
The track was debuted in April 2020 during the virtual Digital Mirage music festival. Gryffin said he wished for the track to be a "timeless dance record" and to symbolise the "first record of the next chapter" of his music.

The song features uplifting guitar melodies, bright pads, atmospheric synths.

Music video
The video was premiered on July 30, 2020. A festival video was premiered on September 10, 2020, featuring footage recorded from festivals around the world that Gryffin played at from 2017 to 2020.

Charts

Weekly charts

Year-end charts

References

2020 singles
2020 songs
Gryffin songs
John Martin (singer) songs